The Haryana Legislative Assembly is the unicameral state legislature of Haryana state in India.

The seat of the Legislative Assembly is at Secretariat Building in Chandigarh, the capital of the state. The term of the Legislative Assembly is five years, unless dissolved earlier. Presently, it comprises 90 members who are directly elected from single-seat constituencies.

List of constituencies
Following is the list of the constituencies of the Haryana Vidhan Sabha since the delimitation of legislative assembly constituencies in 2008. At present, 17 constituencies are reserved for the candidates belonging to the Scheduled castes.

See also
 Election Commission of India

References

External links
 Official website of Chief Electoral Officer, Haryana
 Official website of Election Commission of India

Haryana-related lists
Haryana